The Metropolitan Oval, also known as Met Oval, is a soccer complex located in Maspeth, Queens in New York City.  Village Voice named the complex, which takes up , the "Best full soccer field in the middle of a residential neighborhood" in 2004, for its "pristine" playing surface and the view of the Manhattan skyline.

In addition, the Metropolitan Oval is a MLS Next member. The Metropolitan Oval Academy and facility is led by an all-volunteer Board of Directors.  Miguel Brunengo  serves as the Technical Director of the Academy.

History
The Metropolitan Oval was originally built in 1925 by Germans and ethnic German-Hungarian immigrants to be a European style soccer field with facilities.  From 1925 onwards, the Oval served as a soccer field for men and boys of all ages and ethnicities.  Many U.S. national team players from the New York region played games at the Oval while youths. In 1976 the three-time worlds champions Club Nacional de Football played an exhibition match against Inter Giuliana, the score were favorable for the uruguayans 4-0.      
	
By the 1990s, however, the Oval was in a state of disarray.  Any grass the field once had was gone from overuse.  It owed hundreds of thousands of dollars in back taxes and was scheduled for foreclosure by the city. 
	
In response to this state of affairs, the Metropolitan Oval Foundation was formed to save this historic site.  The non-profit organization led by Jim Vogt, a longtime Queens native, and Chuck Jacob and Valerie Jacob, two New York lawyers dedicated to the restoration of historic soccer fields across the city, raised enough money to save the field from foreclosure.  In addition, Nike and U.S. Soccer Foundation each contributed $250,000 towards the construction of a FieldTurf field and new lights for the complex. FIFA president Sepp Blatter, who visited the Met Oval in November 2001 after the field was resurfaced, called FieldTurf the "future of football."

Currently, the Oval hosts 3-5 games a week from March to November on the field; less than any other facility in New York City. The Met Oval Academy plays at this field against other academy teams in the Northeast Preacademy League. Academies' objectives are to develop young, talented players to play in professional leagues around the world.

Development Academy

In addition to being the name of the field, the Metropolitan Oval is also dedicated to developing the highest-quality soccer talent in New York City while offering youth of all backgrounds the opportunity to play soccer in a committed environment through specialized training, team play, camps and clinics. The Met Oval has teams in age groups ranging from U-6 to U-19.

The Academy is run by Emmy nominated dancer, singer, actor, director, and producer Jeffery Saunders. The Foundation is a  § 501 (c)(3) not-for-profit, charitable foundation incorporated in 1998 with the mission to: provide youth soccer programs for committed players in the New York area, save, restore, and improve the historic Metropolitan Oval soccer facility, and develop soccer players in the New York area to the highest level.

References

External links

German-American history
Maspeth, Queens
Soccer venues in New York City
Sports venues in Queens, New York
Sports venues completed in 1925
1925 establishments in New York City